Chadbourne & Parke LLP, founded in 1902 by Thomas L. Chadbourne, was a 400 lawyer firm, which operated from 
12 offices, in ten countries.  Chadbourne was probably best known for its global practice in project finance and energy, international insurance and reinsurance practice, multi-jurisdictional litigation in courts from Rhode Island to Russia, and corporate transactions.

On February 21, 2017, Norton Rose Fulbright and Chadbourne & Parke agreed to merge into a combined firm known as Norton Rose Fulbright, with about 4,000 lawyers and annual revenue around $2 billion.

Overview
In addition to its United States work, the firm has established substantial practices in Western, Central and Eastern Europe, Turkey, the Middle East and Latin America.

In 2014, the firm moved to its home at 1301 Avenue of the Americas. Prior to 2014, the firm had been located at 30 Rockefeller Plaza, where it occupied eight floors.  The firm moved to Rockefeller Plaza from its original Wall Street home in 1973 in order to become more accessible to its national and international clients.  An even earlier “move” occurred in 1935 when it formed one of the first branch offices of a New York law firm in Washington, DC.  Beginning in 1990 in Moscow, Chadbourne established offices in England, Poland, Ukraine, and Kazakhstan, receiving a significant boost in its Eastern Europe network from the dissolving firms Altheimer & Gray and Coudert Brothers.  In March 2008, the firm acquired the Mexico City office of the New York firm Thacher Proffitt & Wood as well as an associated team of lawyers in New York focusing on Latin America-related arbitration and transactions. Its newest offices opened in São Paulo, Brazil and Istanbul, Turkey respectively.  The firm also has a small satellite office in China.

Chadbourne's clients included Thomas Edison, Winston Churchill, James Joyce and the Wright brothers.  In 1924, Tom Chadbourne orchestrated the consolidation of New York City's subway system.  The firm's success in two landmark cases before the United States Supreme Court in the 1980s created the legal framework for development of the cogeneration and independent power production industries. In its successful representation of French and U.S. clients in the DeLorean sports car fiasco in Northern Ireland, the disclosure of Cabinet minutes was compelled for the first time in British history. The first ever approval for entry of a foreign law firm in India was obtained for Chadbourne and Parke.

Practices
 
Main areas of practice include arbitration, antitrust, commercial and products liability litigation, corporate finance, employment law and ERISA, energy/renewable energy, insolvency/financial restructuring, insurance and reinsurance, intellectual property, mergers and acquisitions, private funds, project finance, real estate, securities litigation and regulatory enforcement, special investigations and litigation, trusts and estates and government contract matters and US and international tax.

In 2012, Chadbourne acted as counsel on the winning and runner-up deals of Power Finance and Risk Magazine's "Renewables Deal of the Year" Awards. Chadbourne's project finance practice is consistently ranked in the top tier by legal guides such as Chambers Global - The World’s Leading Lawyers for Business. The firm's primary projects focus is on energy, telecommunications and toll roads.

The firm's insolvency and financial restructuring group had an impressive record of achieving successful outcomes for its clients in Chapter 11 cases and corporate restructurings both in the United States and abroad. Chadbourne played leading roles in mega-cases such as Tribune Company, ASARCO, Technical Olympic USA (TOUSA), VeraSun Energy, Lehman and AbitibiBowater.

Chadbourne was among the premier international law firms serving the Latin America region. Demonstrating breadth and depth in corporate, project finance, insurance and disputes related matters in the region, the firm's multi-disciplinary and multi-jurisdictional Latin America practice was ranked across the board by legal guides Chambers Latin America - The World’s Leading Lawyers for Business and Legal 500 Latin America.

The firm's European offices werepredominantly staffed by nationals of those countries who provide legal services and advice on local law and foreign direct investment. Chambers Europe - The World’s Leading Lawyers for Business (2012) ranked 15 attorneys from Chadbourne's Russian, Central Europe and Commonwealth of Independent States (CIS) offices as leaders in their field, including partners in the Moscow, Warsaw and Kyiv offices.

In February 2008, Chadbourne formed a climate change practice, led by Gov.  Pataki and Mr. John Cahill.  The practice drew on the experience of Chadbourne's transactional, insurance, regulatory, energy, environmental, litigation and public policy attorneys, and includes expertise in market-based carbon cap and trade programs. This was closely followed by the launch, in April 2008, of a firm-wide "Green Initiative." to implement more environmentally-sustainable practices in the firm's daily practices. This implemented sustainable work-place practices that enabled the firm to reduce its carbon footprint and make a significant positive impact on the environment.

In April 2008, Chadbourne formed a nanotechnologies practice, drawing on the firm's existing practices in energy, insurance, private equity, intellectual property, litigation and products liability.

Notable mandates

Represented the lenders in connection with the $6 billion Sabine Pass Liquefaction LLC Project in Cameron Parish, La. This will be the world's first LNG terminal able to import and gasify LNG and Liquefy and export natural gas. 
PepsiCo in its acquisition of JSC Lebedyansky, a Russian juice manufacturer.
Counsel to Gazprom in the $20 billion project finance to develop the Shtokman field.
Advised the Asian Development Bank in the $412 million project finance for an electrical generating plant in Bà Rịa–Vũng Tàu province, Vietnam.
Antitrust counsel in Brazilian mining company Companhia Vale do Rio Dolce's tender offer for Canadian nickel company Inco, now called CVRD Inco.
Products liability counsel for British American Tobacco in the $280 billion government Racketeer Influenced and Corrupt Organizations Act (RICO) action against cigarette manufacturers.
Arbitration on behalf of Lloyd's of London related to the Enron and Worldcom losses.

Notable attorneys
Thibaut de Saint Phalle, former director of the Export–Import Bank of the United States under Jimmy Carter
Abbe Lowell, chief minority counsel to Democrats in the U.S. House of Representatives during the impeachment of Bill Clinton.
Ed Muskie, Secretary of State and a vice presidential candidate in 1968, was for many years senior partner of the Washington office.
George Bundy Smith joined Chadbourne in December 2006, as a partner in the litigation practice in New York, after retiring as an associate judge of the New York Court of Appeals (the highest court in New York state).
George Pataki, New York governor
Julissa Reynoso, former United States ambassador to Uruguay
George A. Spater, American Airlines chairman who earlier advised airlines for the firm from the 1930s through the 1960s
John Cahill, Pataki's chief of staff
Dana Frix, noted business adviser in the telecom, media and technology industries and general counsel to the Whitaker Peace and Development Initiative
Eddie Huang, American restaurateur, chef, writer, and TV personality
Philip Goodman, former naval officer,  U.S. Treasury official, and chair of financial crime task force for international insurance regulators

References

External links
 Chadbourne & Parke LLP - official site
 
 

Law firms based in New York City
Law firms established in 1902
1902 establishments in New York (state)